Matrishri Usha Jayaswal Mega Power Plant is a coal-fired power station in the state of Jharkhand, India.

References

Proposed coal-fired power stations
Proposed power stations in India
Coal-fired power stations in Jharkhand
Latehar district